Ellen Meloy (June 21, 1946, Pasadena, California – November 4, 2004, Bluff, Utah) was an American nature writer.

Life
She was born Ellen Louise Ditzler in Pasadena, California. She graduated from Goucher College with a degree in art, and from the University of Montana with a master's degree in environmental studies.  She married  her husband Mark Meloy, a river ranger, in 1985. Her nephew is the musician and writer Colin Meloy and her niece is the writer Maile Meloy.

Meloy is the namesake of an award, given yearly by The Ellen Meloy Fund for Desert Writers.

Awards
 1997 Whiting Award
 2003 Pulitzer Prize nomination for The Anthropology of Turquoise Meditations on Landscape, Art & Spirit (2003)
 2007 John Burroughs Medal Award

Selected works
"GROUND ZERO", Salon, February, 24, 1999

Anthologies

American Nature Writing: 2000, the volume was devoted to emerging women writers and was edited by John A. Murray, published by Oregon State University Press: Corvallis.

References

External links
 Ellen Meloy Official website
Profile at The Whiting Foundation

"Ellen Meloy's Deep Nomadology", rhizomes.13 Dianne Chisholm, fall 2006
"The Art of Ecological Thinking: Literary Ecology", "ISLE 18.3" Dianne Chisholm, fall 2011
 Chisholm, Dianne. “Biophilia, Creative Involution, and the Ecological Future of Queer Desire.” In Queer Ecologies: Sex, Nature, Politics, and Desire. Eds.  Catriona Mortimer-Sandilands and Bruce Erickson. Indiana University Press. 359–81. 

1946 births
2004 deaths
20th-century American women writers
20th-century American non-fiction writers
21st-century American non-fiction writers
21st-century American women writers
Writers from Utah
John Burroughs Medal recipients
Goucher College alumni
University of Montana alumni